Flassavatnet is a lake in Rogaland county, Norway. The lake lies on the border of the municipalities of Gjesdal and Sandnes. The lake is a reservoir with a small dam on the southern edge of the lake.

See also
List of lakes in Norway

References

Gjesdal
Sandnes
Lakes of Rogaland